Richard Dove Williams Jr. (born February 14, 1942) is a former American tennis coach and the father of tennis players Venus Williams and Serena Williams.

Early life 
Williams is the oldest of five children and the only son of Julia Mae ( Metcalf) and Richard Dove Williams of Shreveport, Louisiana. His younger sisters are Pat, Barbara, Penny, and Faye. After graduating from high school he moved to Saginaw, Michigan and then to California.

Tennis coaching 

Williams took tennis lessons from a man known as "Old Whiskey" and decided his future daughters would be tennis professionals after seeing Virginia Ruzici playing on television. Williams said that he wrote up an 85-page plan and started giving lessons to Venus and Serena when they were four and a half, taking them to practice on public tennis courts.  Williams later added that he felt he took them too early and  age six would have been more suitable. In 1995, Williams withdrew his daughters from a tennis academy and coached them himself. Within a few years, they were winning grand slam tournaments.

Serena won the US Open in 1999 and Venus beat Lindsay Davenport to win the 2000 Wimbledon title. After that victory, Richard shouted "Straight Outta Compton!", in reference to a song by N.W.A based in Compton, California, the same area in Los Angeles where the family once resided. He jumped over the NBC broadcasting booth, catching Chris Evert by surprise and performing a triumphant dance. Evert said that the broadcasters "thought the roof was coming down".

Personal life 

Born in Shreveport, Louisiana to a family of sharecroppers, Richard Williams had childhood experiences with racism.  He has been open about his difficult childhood and experiences with racism and has credited his faith as a source of strength throughout each season of his life. Williams has been married three times and has nine children. 

Prior to meeting his future wife Oracene Price in 1970s, Williams moved to Saginaw, Michigan then California, and met his first wife Betty Johnson. Johnson and Williams married in 1965 and had five children, three sons and two daughters: Sabrina, Richard III, Ronner, Reluss, and Reneeka, who were raised alongside Betty's other daughter, Katrina. Williams and Johnson divorced in 1973.

In 1979, he met Oracene "Brandy" Price, who had three daughters from a previous relationship in California, and they married in 1980. They have two daughters together, Venus and Serena, both of whom went on to become tennis champions. They married in 1980 and had two daughters, Venus (born June 17, 1980) and Serena (born September 26, 1981). The family resided in Compton, California. Richard and Oracene divorced in 2002.

Richard then met grocery store owner Lakeisha Juanita Graham, and they married in 2010. They have a son. They divorced in 2017.

Williams has a son, Chavoita, from a relationship outside his marriages.

In most recent years, Williams has accomplished much and overcome health struggles. He authored two books: "Black and White: The Way I See It," a memoir published in 2014, and "Richard Williams: Tennis and Race in the United States," a study of race and tennis that was published in 2020. He has also been the subject of several documentaries and has been featured in various media outlets. However, in July 2016, Williams suffered a stroke. At the time his then-wife, Lakeisha Williams, stated that his condition was stable. In 2022, Williams was reported to have had two strokes.

In popular culture 
A biographical film, King Richard, starring Will Smith as Richard Williams, was released on November 19, 2021, in theaters by Warner Bros. Pictures and streaming on HBO Max. The film was directed by Reinaldo Marcus Green and written by Zach Baylin. Venus and Serena served as executive producers.

Smith received critical acclaim for his performance and won numerous awards, including the 2022 Academy Award for Best Actor in a Leading Role, Golden Globe Award for Best Actor in a Motion Picture Drama and the Screen Actor's Guild Award for Outstanding Performance by a Male Actor in a Leading Role in a Motion Picture.

Books

References

External links 

 SportsIllustrated.com, about the Indian Wells incident
 Women's tour CEO reacts to Richard Williams' remarks on racism

1942 births
African-American tennis coaches
American tennis coaches
Living people
Sportspeople from Shreveport, Louisiana
Tennis people from California
Tennis people from Louisiana
21st-century African-American people
20th-century African-American sportspeople
Williams family (tennis)